"Rozpryahayte, khloptsi, koni" is a Ukrainian folk song. The song is known in the records of folklorists since the 19th century. In the Soviet Union, the song became widely known after the 1939 release of the movie Tractor Drivers.

History
In the 20th century, the folklorist and choir conductor  recorded and edited the song. In 1935, it was performed by the Red Army Choir under the direction of Alexander Vasilyevich Alexandrov.

According to Ukrainian folklorist Leonid Kaufman, the folk song was written by Dmytro Balatsky in 1918. Local historian Viktor Yalanskyi in the book Nestor and Halyna, published in 1999, cites the assumption of Nestor Makhno's wife Halyna Kuzmenko that the author of this work is Ivan Negrebytskyi, a Makhnovist from Poltava.

Over time, the work was translated for the military orchestras of the Red Army and the Armed Forces of Ukraine, such as "Ukrainian March" by Simon Chernetsky. In the 1970s, a version of the song performed by the Kuban Cossack Choir with the refrain "Marusya once, two, three viburnums" became widely known.

Derivative works
With the beginning of World War I, the Russian writer Vladimir Gilyarovsky penned the text "March of the Siberian Regiment" (1915) to the tune of "Unhitch the horses, boys." Later, the same melody was used in the Russian Civil War song "Po dolinam i po vzgoriam".

Lyrics

See also 
Lyubo, bratsy, lyubo

References

Anarchist songs
Makhnovshchina
Ukrainian folk songs
19th-century songs
Songwriter unknown